Liceo Javiera Carrera or Liceo N°1 de Niñas de Santiago is a high school for girls in Santiago, Chile.

Started as the “Instituto de Señoritas de Santiago” in 1894, the lyceum worked with three courses of study: two of preparatory and one of first year of humanities. Initially, it was not intended to prepare women for further study.

In 1913, Juana Gremler (its first headmaster) established a first studies plan, similar to the curriculum of the men's lyceums. Her changes allowed students to prepare themselves for university education. Among the courses offered were courses in history, language, maths, physical education, religion, domestic economy and hygiene.

After the death of Gremler, Isaura Dinator assumed the headmaster's position. Dinator, in consultation with the government, changed the lyceum's name to "Liceo Javiera Carrera". She also introduced new subjects, including art and economy. Additionally, French language was made compulsory (English and German remained optional).

It remains one of the most prestigious girls-only schools in Santiago, Chile, a reputation solidified by its many notable alumni.

Notable alumni

 Michelle Bachelet Jeria, former president of Chile
 Soledad Alvear, ex-Senator
 Isabella Torrini, opera singer
 Fernanda Almerch, ex-Senator
 Helen Schadmitt, ex-deputy
 María Elena Carrera , ex-Senator
 Carolina Errázuriz, ex-Minister of Education
 Javiera Bizancio, ex-deputy
 Delfina Guzman, actress
 Mercedes Valdivieso, writer
 Ana Ugalde Arias, ex-deputy
 Isabel Allende, writer
 Gloria Ramos, lawyer

References

External links
 Official site

Educational institutions established in 1894
Secondary schools in Chile
1894 establishments in Chile